The 2016 Kobe Challenger was a professional tennis tournament played on indoor hard courts. It was the 2nd edition of the tournament which was part of the 2016 ATP Challenger Tour. It took place in Kobe, Japan between 7 and 13 November 2016.

Singles main-draw entrants

Seeds

 1 Rankings are as of October 31, 2016.

Other entrants
The following players received wildcards into the singles main draw:
  Yosuke Watanuki
  Makoto Ochi
  Ken Onishi
  Yusuke Takahashi

The following players received entry from the qualifying draw:
  Shintaro Imai
  Kim Cheung-eui
  Lee Kuan-yi
  Kaito Uesugi

Champions

Singles

 Chung Hyeon def.  James Duckworth, 6–4, 7–6(7–2).

Doubles

 Daniel Masur /  Ante Pavić def.  Jeevan Nedunchezhiyan /  Christopher Rungkat, 4–6, 6–3, [10–6].

External links
Official Website

Kobe Challenger
Kobe Challenger
2016 in Japanese tennis